Yannick Cortie  (born 7 May 1993) is a Dutch footballer who plays as a left back for SteDoCo in the Dutch Derde Divisie. He formerly played for FC Utrecht and Helmond Sport.

References

External links
 

1993 births
Living people
Dutch footballers
Association football defenders
FC Utrecht players
Helmond Sport players
IJsselmeervogels players
SteDoCo players
Eredivisie players
Eerste Divisie players
Tweede Divisie players
Derde Divisie players
Footballers from Amsterdam
21st-century Dutch people